Gisbert Haefs (born 9 January 1950) is a German writer in several genres and translator. He has written historical novels such as Alexander, won both the Deutscher Science Fiction Preis and Kurd-Laßwitz-Preis in science fiction, and placed at the Deutscher Krimi Preis for crime fiction. As a translator he worked on a much criticized effort at translating works of Jorge Luis Borges into German.

References

External links 
 
 Gisbert Haefs in: NRW Literatur im Netz 

German crime fiction writers
German historical fiction writers
German science fiction writers
1950 births
Living people
German male novelists
German translators
German male non-fiction writers